Thorn or þorn (Þ, þ) is a letter in the Old English, Old Norse, Old Swedish and modern Icelandic alphabets, as well as modern transliterations of the Gothic alphabet, Middle Scots, and some dialects of Middle English. It was also used in medieval Scandinavia, but was later replaced with the digraph th, except in Iceland, where it survives. The letter originated from the rune  in the Elder Fuþark and was called thorn in the Anglo-Saxon and thorn or thurs in the Scandinavian rune poems.  It is similar in appearance to the archaic Greek letter sho (ϸ), although the two are historically unrelated. The only language in which þ is currently in use in is Icelandic.

It is pronounced as either a voiceless dental fricative  or its voiced counterpart . However, in modern Icelandic, it is pronounced as a laminal voiceless alveolar non-sibilant fricative , similar to th as in the English word thick, or a (usually apical) voiced alveolar non-sibilant fricative , similar to th as in the English word the.

In typography, the lowercase thorn character is unusual in that it has both an ascender and a descender (other examples are the lowercase Cyrillic ф, and, in some [especially italic] fonts, the Latin letters f and ſ ).

Uses

English

Old English 

The letter thorn was used for writing Old English very early on, as was ð, also called eth. Unlike eth, thorn remained in common use through most of the Middle English period. Both letters were used for the phoneme , sometimes by the same scribe. A thorn with the ascender crossed (Ꝥ) was a popular abbreviation for the word that.

Middle and Early Modern English 
 
The modern digraph th began to grow in popularity during the 14th century; at the same time, the shape of  grew less distinctive, with the letter losing its ascender (becoming similar in appearance to the old wynn, which had fallen out of use by 1300, and to ancient through modern). One major reason for this was that  existed in the printer's types that were imported from Belgium and the Netherlands, while  did not. The word was never pronounced with a "y" sound, though, even when so written. The first printing of the King James Version of the Bible in 1611 used ye for "the" in places such as Job 1:9, John 15:1, and Romans 15:29. It also used yt as an abbreviation for "that", in places such as 2 Corinthians 13:7. All were replaced in later printings by the or that, respectively.

Abbreviations 

The following were scribal abbreviations during Middle and Early Modern English using the letter thorn:
  (þͤ) a Middle English abbreviation for the word the
  (þͭ) a Middle English abbreviation for the word that
In later printed texts, given the lack of a sort for the glyph, printers substituted the (visually similar) letter y for the thorn:
 an Early Modern English abbreviation for the word this
  (yͤ) an Early Modern English abbreviation for the word the
  (yͭ) an Early Modern English abbreviation for the word that

Modern English 
Thorn in the form of a "Y" survives in pseudo-archaic uses, particularly the stock prefix "ye olde". The definite article spelt with "Y" for thorn is often jocularly or mistakenly pronounced  ("yee") or mistaken for the archaic nominative case of the second person plural pronoun, "ye", as in "hear ye!".

Khmer
Þþ sometimes used in Khmer romanization to represents  .

Icelandic
Icelandic is the only living language to keep the letter thorn (in Icelandic; þ, pronounced þoddn,  or þorn ). The letter is the 30th in the Icelandic alphabet, modelled after Old Norse alphabet in the 19th century; it is transliterated to th when it cannot be reproduced and never appears at the end of a word. For example, the name of Hafþór Júlíus Björnsson is anglicised as Hafthor.

Its pronunciation has not varied much, but before the introduction of the eth character, þ was used to represent the sound , as in the word "verþa", which is now spelt verða (meaning "to become") in modern Icelandic or normalized orthography. Þ was originally taken from the runic alphabet and is described in the First Grammatical Treatise from the 12th-century:

Computing codes

Variants 
Various forms of thorn were used for medieval scribal abbreviations:
 
 
 
 
  was used in the Middle English Ormulum

See also 
 Pronunciation of English ⟨th⟩
 Sho (letter), a similar letter in the Greek alphabet used to write the Bactrian language
 Yogh, a letter used in Middle English and Older Scots
 Wynn, another runic letter used in Old English
 Eth, another Old English and Icelandic letter

References

Bibliography 
 Freeborn, Dennis (1992) From Old English to Standard English. London: Macmillan

External links 

Icelandic language
Old English
TH
Middle English
Latin-script letters
Palaeographic letters
English th